The York Region Shooters were a soccer team playing in the Canadian Professional Soccer League from 1998–2002. They played their home matches in the town of Aurora, Ontario, north of Toronto.

The franchise was one of the original teams of the CPSL. The team had its origins in the York Region Soccer League and were previously known as the York Region Stallions. During its five-year stint in the CPSL the club failed to secure a postseason berth, but managed to develop some top talent for the Canadian national team. In 2002, the York Region Shooters were sold by the Bisceglia family to Tony De Thomasis, and merged the club with the Vaughan Sun Devils in 2003.

History

In 1994, Frank Bisceglia formed York Region Stallions and competed in the Metropolitan Toronto Soccer League. Later were transferred to the Newmarket Premier League under the name Aurora Shooters. In 1998, renamed the York Region Shooters they were promoted to the professional level by becoming a charter member of the Canadian Professional Soccer League, and received territorial rights to Aurora, Ontario in the York Region. Sam Foti was given the head coach responsibilities, and made their professional debut on May 31, 1998 against Mississauga Eagles P.S.C. in a 3–1 victory with the goals coming from Mike Glasgow, and Diego Saenz. Their debut season saw the club finish fifth in the standings, but missed the final postseason berth by 2 points.

The following season the Shooters moved south to Richmond Hill, Ontario. Their performance throughout the season saw a decline as they finished seventh in the standings. In 2000, the organization brought in Bijan Azizi to manage the team. York Region matched their 1998 season by finishing fifth in the standings just 4 points shy of a playoff berth. At the conclusion of the season Willy Giummarra received the CPSL MVP award. Adam Pagliaroli was appointed the head coach for the 2001 season, but unfortunately failed as his predecessors in securing a postseason berth by finishing eleventh in the standings.

In 2002, a change occurred in the ownership with Tony De Thomasis purchasing the club from Bisceglia. De Thomasis returned Highland Park in Aurora, and hired Vito Colangelo for the head coach position. In preparation for the 2002 season Colangelo brought in the likes of Atiba Hutchinson, Adrian Cann, Andres Arango, Stuart Black, Piotr Libicz, and Cameron Medwin. During the season the CPSL divided the league into two Conferences with York Region being placed in the Eastern Conference. The 2002 season saw an improvement in the club's performance, but for the fifth straight year the Shooters failed to secure a postseason berth by finishing fourth in their conference. In 2003, the club merged with their rivals the Vaughan Sun Devils and united the York Region territory under principal owner De Thomasis.

Head coaches

Year-by-year

Notable players 

Canada 
 Andres Arango  
 Stuart Black  
 Adrian Cann  
 Willy Giummarra  
 Atiba Hutchinson  
 Cameron Medwin  
 Irvin Studin

References

External links
 York Region Shooters
 Canadian Soccer League

York Region Shooters
Association football clubs established in 1994
Soccer clubs in Ontario
Canadian Soccer League (1998–present) teams
Defunct soccer clubs in Canada
Aurora, Ontario
1994 establishments in Ontario